Mont-Saint-Aignan is a commune in the Seine-Maritime department in the region of Normandy, northwestern France.

The inhabitants of the town of Mont-Saint-Aignan are called Mont-Saint-Aignanais in French.

Due to the presence of higher education institutions (notably the University of Rouen and the NEOMA Business School) and the city's relatively small population, Mont-Saint-Aignan is considered the French city that has the largest proportion of students relative to its population (students represented in 2014 25,61% of the total population).

Geography
The town is the fifth-largest suburb of the city of Rouen and lies directly adjacent to the north side of Rouen at the junction of the D121 and D43. In addition to its population of 21,265, there are also around 20,000 students at the University and the various Grandes Écoles.

History
The town is ultimately named for the ancient Saint Aignan of Orleans.

The parishes of Saint-Aignan and Mont-aux-Malades (Monte Infirmorum, which takes its name from a hospital) are mentioned in documents dating back to the 12th century. Henry II built a church there dedicated to Thomas Becket in 1176 in an attempt to make up for his unwitting role in the murder of the Archbishop of Canterbury.

The modern commune of Mont-Saint-Aignan was created in the early 19th century (1815–1819) out of the merger of the communes of Monts-aux-Malades, Saint-Aignan and (partly) Saint-Denis-de-Bondeville.

Heraldry

People
 

Jacques Anquetil (1934–1987), first cyclist to win the Tour de France five times
Viviane Asseyi, footballer
Ousmane Camara, basketball player
Flora Coquerel, Miss France 2014
Maurice Euzennat (1926–2004), historian and archaeologist
Thierry Foucaud (1954- ), politician
govy, artist
Franck Haise, football manager and former player
Jamel Ait Ben Idir, footballer
Lagaf', humorist and television presenter 
Sébastien Larcier, footballer
Pierrick Lebourg, professional footballer
Matthieu Louis-Jean, footballer
Jackson Mendy, footballer
Tony Parker, basketball player
Mohamed Sissoko, footballer
Lucien Tesnière (1893–1954), linguist
Sébastien Le Toux, footballer

Population

Places of interest
 The church of St. Jacques, dating from the eleventh century, used as a workshop after the Revolution
 The church of St. Thomas, dating from the twelfth century
 The sixteenth century church of St. Aignan
 The nineteenth century church of St. André
 The modern church of Notre-Dame-de-Miséricorde (1970)
 The chapel of the Petit-Séminaire (1862)
 Several ancient houses

Colleges and universities
 University of Rouen
 NEOMA Business School (former École Supérieure de Commerce de Rouen)
 Institut de Formation Internationale (part of the Business School)
 ésitpa (agriculture and agronomy)
 ESIGELEC formerly in Mont-Saint-Aignan; moved in 2004 to nearby Saint-Étienne-du-Rouvray
 Institut National des Sciences Appliquées de Rouen (INSA Rouen) also - since Oct 2009 - now wholly in Saint-Étienne-du-Rouvray

Twin towns – sister cities

Mont-Saint-Aignan is twinned with:
 Barsinghausen, Germany (1967)
 Edenbridge, England (1973)
 Osica de Sus, Romania (1991)
 Brzeg Dolny, Poland (2003)
 Rouko, Burkina Faso (2010)

References

External links

City council website 
Info website-blog about Mont Saint Aignan 

Communes of Seine-Maritime